Don Kramer (born December 12, 1940) was an American businessman and politician.

From Brooklyn Center, Minnesota, Kramer received a bachelor's degree from Saint John's University and a master's degree from University of North Dakota. He was a small business owner. In December 1994, he was elected to the Minnesota Senate in a special election and served there in 1996 and 1996. He was a Republican.

Notes

1940 births
Living people
People from Brooklyn Center, Minnesota
College of Saint Benedict and Saint John's University alumni
University of North Dakota alumni
Businesspeople from Minnesota
Republican Party Minnesota state senators